Carlos Alberto Souto Maior Silva Batista (born 20 December 1972), commonly known as Calita, is a Portuguese former footballer who played as a midfielder.

Football career
Calita started his career with Imortal DC. He had only played in seven Primeira Liga games for S.C. Farense when he was purchased by Coventry City on 5 July 1995, after failing a trial at Blackburn Rovers, for a fee reported as ranging from £125,000 to £350,000. He never broke into the first team with the Premier League club and finished 1995–96 back in his country with Boavista, also in the top division.

During his short spell in England, he was known as Carlita. He was the first Portuguese footballer to be signed by an English Premier League club. But he later revealed that he joined Coventry City after having been made false salary promises, and he left the club because his actual income was barely enough to live on.

From 1997 until his retirement two decades later, Calita never played higher than the third level of Portuguese football and predominantly competed in the second regional division, with most of the teams hailing from the Algarve region.

Notes

References

External links

1972 births
Living people
Portuguese footballers
Association football midfielders
Primeira Liga players
Segunda Divisão players
Imortal D.C. players
C.D. Nacional players
S.C. Farense players
Louletano D.C. players
Boavista F.C. players
Coventry City F.C. players
Portuguese expatriate footballers
Expatriate footballers in England
Footballers from Lisbon